Theres is a municipality on the river Main, in the district of Haßberge in Bavaria in Germany. It was once the site of Theres Abbey, but the church was demolished in 1809.

References

Haßberge (district)